CLG Chloich Cheann Fhaola is a Gaelic football and handball club for the parish of Cloughaneely, County Donegal, Ireland. The club is based in Falcarragh. It also covers the area to the village of Gortahork, as well as Meenlaragh and Magheroarty. The club fields both men's and ladies' teams from underage as far as senior level.

The club has a rivalry with St Michael's.

Its honorary president, Fr Seán Ó Gallchóir, is a statistician who compiled The Book of Donegal GAA Facts. John Horan gave him a GAA President's Award in 2021.

History
As of 2018, the club was competing in the Donegal League Division 1, and in the Senior Football Championship (SFC).

Manager Joe McGarvey led the club to the 2014 Donegal IFC but resigned shortly afterwards, to be replaced by backroom team member John Paul Gallagher.

Former captain, John Harley, was killed in a traffic collision in 2019. Another player, Daniel Scott, was killed in the same collision. Captained by Harley's brother Mark, the club reached the final of the IFC in 2019. The club won the IFC in 2021.

Notable players

 Jason McGee — 2019 Ulster SFC winner and past Australian rules football trialist
 Charlie McGeever
 Kevin Mulhern — 2010 Ulster Under-21 FC winner and 2010 All-Ireland Under-21 FC finalist
 John 'Wildman' McFadden

Managers

Honours
 Donegal Intermediate Football Championship (3): 2006, 2014, 2021
 Donegal Junior Football Championship (3): 1938, 1939, 1959
 Comórtas Peile na Gaeltachta Dhún na nGall - Sinsír (?): …1998, 2017

References

Gaelic games clubs in County Donegal
Gaelic football clubs in County Donegal
The Rosses